Acalyptris hispidus is a moth of the family Nepticulidae. It was described by Puplesis and Robinson in 2000. It is known from Belize.

References

Nepticulidae
Endemic fauna of Belize
Moths of Central America
Moths described in 2000